The Judiciary of Puerto Rico is defined under the Constitution of Puerto Rico and consists of the Supreme Court of Puerto Rico, Court of Appeals, and the Court of First Instance consisting of the Superior Courts and the Municipal Courts.

Courts 
The courts consist of the:

 Supreme Court of Puerto Rico;
 Court of Appeals; and
 Court of First Instance.

Supreme Court 
The Supreme Court of Puerto Rico is the highest court of Puerto Rico, having judicial authority to interpret and decide questions of Puerto Rican law. The Court is analogous to one of the state supreme courts of the states of the United States; being the Supreme Court of Puerto Rico the highest state court and the court of last resort in Puerto Rico. Article V of the Constitution of Puerto Rico vests the  judicial power on the Supreme Court

Court of Appeals 
The Court of Appeals of Puerto Rico reviews decisions of the Courts of First Instance in addition to the final decisions of administrative agencies. The Judiciary Act of 1992 created the Court of Appeal as an intermediate court between the Courts of First Instance and the Supreme Court. The seat of the Court is in San Juan, Puerto Rico. The Court consists of 39 judges.

Court of First Instance 
The Court of First Instance is further composed of the:

 Superior Courts; and
 Municipal Courts.

In 2003, the Court of First Instance was divided into 13 districts for administrative purposes.

Superior Courts 
The Superior Courts are courts of general jurisdiction, and where felony trials are held. They also try driving under the influence cases.

Municipal Courts 
There is a Municipal Court for each of the 78 Municipalities of Puerto Rico. They have traditionally been like Justice of the Peace courts, empowered to fix bail and issue arrest and search warrants.

They replaced the previous District Courts by Act No. 92 of 5 December 1991. The District Courts were the lowest courts of general jurisdiction. As of 15 July 2013, the "Tribunal de Distrito" in Puerto Rico was still in the process of being "abolished". The District Courts typically held probable cause hearings in driving under the influence cases.

Administration 
Article V, Section 6 of the Constitution of Puerto Rico and Section 2003 of the Judiciary Act of 1995 empowers the Supreme Court of Puerto Rico to adopt rules of court. It is supported by the Office of Court Administration led by the Administrative Director of the Courts.

The Bar Association of Puerto Rico is the bar association.

Officers

Judges 
The Court of Appeals judges are appointed by the Governor with the advice and consent of the Senate and serve for a period of 16 years.

The judges of the Court are appointed by the Governor with the advice and consent of the Senate. Both Superior Court judges and Municipal Court judges are appointed for a term of 12 years.

See also
 Government of Puerto Rico
 Law of Puerto Rico
 Law enforcement in Puerto Rico
 United States District Court for the District of Puerto Rico

References

External links 
 La Rama Judicial de Puerto Rico 
 The Exclusion of Non-English-Speaking Jurors: Remedying a Century of Denial of the Sixth Amendment in the Federal Courts of Puerto Rico. Jasmine B. Gonzales Rose. Harvard Civil Rights-Civil Liberties Law Review. Vol. 46. (2011) Pages 497-549.